The 1870 Merionethshire by-election was a parliamentary by-election held for the House of Commons constituency of Merionethshire in North Wales on 17 January 1870.

Vacancy
The by-election was caused by the death of the sitting Liberal MP, David Williams

Candidates
Two candidates were nominated.

The Liberal Party nominated former High Sheriff of Merionethshire Samuel Smith.

The Conservative Party nominated Charles John Tottenham, an Honorary Colonel in the Denbighshire Yeomanry Cavalry.

Results

References

1870 elections in the United Kingdom
By-elections to the Parliament of the United Kingdom in Welsh constituencies
1870 in Wales
1870s elections in Wales
January 1870 events
History of Merionethshire
Constituencies of the Parliament of the United Kingdom established in 1542
Constituencies of the Parliament of the United Kingdom disestablished in 1974